Cervalces scotti, the elk moose or stag-moose, is an extinct species of large deer that lived in North America during the Late Pleistocene epoch. It had palmate antlers that were more complex than those of a moose and a muzzle more closely resembling that of a typical deer. It is the only known North American member of the genus Cervalces.

Description

It was as large as the moose, with an elk-like head, long legs, and palmate antlers that were more complex and heavily branching than the moose. The stag-moose resided in North America during an era with other megafauna such as the woolly mammoth, ground sloth, long horn bison, and saber toothed cat. The species became extinct approximately 11,500 years ago, toward the end of the most recent ice age, as part of a mass extinction of large North American mammals.

The first evidence of Cervalces scotti found in modern times was discovered at Big Bone Lick, Kentucky by William Clark, circa 1805. A more complete skeleton was found in 1885 by William Barryman Scott in New Jersey. Mummified remains have also been found. One of the most complete Cervalces skulls ever discovered was dredged from a pond in Kendallville, Indiana and dated to 13,500 BP.

Evolution
The ancestor of Cervalces scotti is believed to have evolved on the Eurasian continent. Cervalces scotti is believed to be related to Cervalces latifrons, another similar species that became extinct around the same time as Cervalces scotti.  It shared the spruce parkland ecosystem with other Pleistocene megafauna, such as the caribou, moose, the woodland musk-ox, and the giant beaver, in a range from southern Canada to Arkansas and from Iowa to New Jersey. As the glaciers retreated, moose (which had crossed the Bering land bridge from Asia) may have populated the habitat of Cervalces scotti and caused its extinction by competition. Although there is no paleontological evidence that it was associated with humans, other theories for its extinction have been proposed. Notably, there is speculation that hunting by newly arrived humans caused the extinction of the Cervalces scotti and other  large mammals. Additionally, some have proposed a sudden extinction by disease, brought by small mammals in association with humans. The oldest known fossil of Cervalces scotti was found in the bed of the Skunk River in Iowa, with the specimen dating back approximately 30,000 years ago. The area in which the fossil was found and the date implies that Cervalces scotti lived before a massive ice sheet covered the area in which it inhabited, which could also be a possible cause of its extinction. Since the stag-moose resided in a woodland habitat, climate change and loss of natural pastures also could have played a role in its extinction.

Cervalces scotti probably lived in a narrow geographic range, characterized by a spruce-dominant mixed conifer and deciduous wet woodland  which may have made it more vulnerable to extinction. Remains of Cervalces scotti found in modern-day Ohio have suggested that it and Homo sapiens could have possibly interacted. Fossils of both Cervalces scotti and other large extinct mammals in the area suggest that it have been a frequent target of early human hunters. Remains of the stag moose, along with Paleo Indian artifacts and the remains of  the flat-headed peccary, giant short-faced bear, and the giant beaver were found in the Sheriden Cave in Wyandot County, Ohio.

Palaeobiology
Cervalces scotti, like several other members of its genus, probably lived in marshes, swamps and bogs, as well as spruce-taiga floral communities. There were also surroundings ranging from tundra–mixed coniferous forests to deciduous woodlands. These sedges and willows may have not have been suitable food products, but they provide an imagery of the ecology of the stag-moose. The change in flora and fauna due to complete deglaciation probably also affected the living conditions of the stag-moose in states like Iowa and Wisconsin, where the stag-moose was found at more than 20 sites. None of these sites, however, has any evidence that the stag-moose interacted with humans, furthering evidence that the extinction of the stag-moose is not comparable to that of large herbivores that were greatly affected by hunting. The stag-moose reproduced more often than megaherbivores, and so the hypothesis is that the stag-moose's disappearance is linked to the emergence of the "true moose" (Alces alces), instead. Another reason for extinction could be the competition of several herbivorous artiodactyls, like the Bison in the new grassland ecosystem which replaced the spruce forest environment.

References

External links
Stag Moose Image Gallery

Cervalces
Prehistoric deer
Pleistocene even-toed ungulates
Pleistocene extinctions
Prehistoric mammals of North America
Fossil taxa described in 1885